Matsanga is a town located in the Niari Region of the Republic of the Congo.

Populated places in the Republic of the Congo